John Martinkus is an Australian print and television journalist known for his reporting from conflict zones.

He began reporting from Indonesian-occupied East Timor in 1995 and set up base there permanently in 1998. His reporting for Associated Press helped sway the international community to send in a UN peacekeeping force in late 1999 after the Indonesian military reacted violently to a UN-held referendum in which 87% of East Timorese voted for Independence.

He reported extensively from Papua and Aceh in Indonesia, two provinces which have also had long-running wars for separation from Indonesia.

He also reported from Afghanistan and Iraq. In October 2004, he was kidnapped outside his hotel in Baghdad by Sunni Insurgents who released him 24 hours later after using the internet to verify his status as a journalist.

In 2011, Martinkus was commissioned to travel to Afghanistan as the Official Australian War Cinematographer for the Australian War Memorial.

Martinkus lives in Hobart, Tasmania. He previously taught in the School of Journalism, Media and Communications at the University of Tasmania.

Bibliography

Books

Paradise Betrayed: West Papua's Struggle for Independence (Black Inc 2002)
Indonesia's Secret War in Aceh (Random House 2004)
Travels in American Iraq (Black Inc 2004)
Lost Copy: The Endless Wars: Iraq and Afghanistan (Australian Scholarly Publishing 2017)
The Road: Uprising in West Papua (Black Inc 2020)

Articles and other contributions

References

Living people
Australian television journalists
Quarterly Essay people
Year of birth missing (living people)